Sovite (or sövite) is the coarse-grained variety (or facies) of carbonatite, an intrusive, igneous rock. The finer-grained variety of carbonatite is known as alvikite. The two varieties are distinguished by minor and trace element compositions. Sovite is often a medium-to-coarse-grained calcite rock with variable accessory amphibole, biotite, pyrite, pyrochlore and fluorite.

See also
 Panda Hill Carbonatite

References

Igneous rocks